Loaded (also known as Duff McKagan's Loaded) is an American hard rock band from Seattle, Washington, formed in 1999. Since 2001, the band's line-up has included vocalist and rhythm guitarist Duff McKagan (Velvet Revolver and formerly of Guns N' Roses), lead guitarist Mike Squires (formerly of Nevada Bachelors and Alien Crime Syndicate) and bassist Jeff Rouse (formerly of Alien Crime Syndicate, Sirens Sister and Vendetta Red). Since 2009, Isaac Carpenter (formerly of Loudermilk, Gosling and The Exies) has been the band's drummer replacing Geoff Reading (formerly of New American Shame and Green Apple Quick Step). The band has released 3 studio albums, 1 live album, 1 extended play, 4 singles and 4 music videos.

Albums

Studio albums

Live albums

Extended plays

Singles

A  "Greed" (Duff McKagan's Loaded) / "I's the Blues" (The Loyalties) is a split 7" vynil single released with the band The Loyalties containing previously unreleased songs from each band and limited to 666 copies.

Other appearances

Music videos

References

External links

Rock music group discographies